

Offseason
May 5: Jenna Ouellette will continue her playing career in Switzerland. She signed a professional contract to play in Langethal for the DHC Langenthal Club. The Club is part of the Swiss Division I league.
July 16: Maria Lewis has been named the new head coach of the Black Bears. She spe the last three seasons as an assistant coach at the University of North Dakota. During the 1999–2000 season, she was a volunteer coach with the Black Bears.

Recruiting
April 28: Former ice hockey coach Dan Lichterman announced the program has received five commitments for the 2010-2011 season. Forwards Missy Denk, Kristi King, Jenny Kistner, defenders Kelly McDonald and Kayla Kaluzny will join the Black Bears for the upcoming season.

Regular season

News and notes
Brittany Ott made a school record 69 saves on October 9 against the Mercyhurst Lakers. She made 34 saves in the second period. The following day, Ott made 45 saves to give her a total of 114 saves against Mercyhurst.
At 3–3–0, Maine has had the best start to a season since they were 3–2–1 to start the season in 2004–05
December 3: Kelly McDonald tallied her first collegiate point with an assist.
December 4–5: Dawn Sullivan scored a game-winning goal and accumulated three assists on the weekend for Maine.
December 5: The Black Bears had their six-game unbeaten streak snapped when they lost to Vermont 4–3 in overtime. The Black Bears have scored power play goals in their last five games as Jennie Gallo is the Black Bears leader with five power play tallies.
December 31: The Black Bears are raising funds for Breast Cancer research by selling pink pucks for a minimum donation of one dollar. The Pink Puck campaign leads up to the annual Skating Strides Against Breast Cancer game that will take place this season on Jan. 22 against Connecticut.
Heading into the holiday break, the Black Bears are now 2–2–0 against the ECAC and are 6–4–2 in non-conference play. Their seven wins this season is the most for the program since the 2006–07 season. In addition, the Black Bears ran a streak of scoring a power play goal in six straight games (snapped on December 10). Brittany Dougherty had a six game point scoring streak (also snapped on the 10th). The team is undefeated when scoring the first goal of the game as they are 7–0–2.
January 2: Maine lost 2–1 to the Providence Friars. Dominique Goutsis notched the lone goal for Maine. With the goal, she set a new career high for goals in a season (it was her fourth goal). Despite the loss, Maine is off to their best start in five years at 8–8–4 since starting the 2005–06 season at 10–4–5.
February 12:Myriam Croussette scored the opening goal just 20 seconds into the game against Boston College. Her second goal of the contest was a game-winning goal (and her third point of the game). The Black Bears now pulled to within one point of New Hampshire for the final playoff spot.

Standings

Schedule

Conference record

Awards and honors
Myriam Crousette, Hockey East Player of the Week (Week of February 14)

 Candice Currier, Maine,  Runner-Up, Hockey East Goaltender of the Month (December 2010)
Brittany Dougherty, Hockey East Player of the Week (Week of September 27)
Jenny Kistner, Hockey East Rookie of the Week (Week of September 27)
Brittany Ott, Hockey East Defensive Player of the Week (Week of September 27)
Brittany Ott, Hockey East Defensive Player of the Week (Week of October 11)
Brittany Ott, Maine, Runner-Up, Hockey East Goaltender of the Month (November 2010) 
Dawn Sullivan, Runner-Up, Hockey East Pure Hockey Player of the Month (December 2010)
Hockey East women's Team of the Week (Week of September 27)
Hockey East women's Team of the Week (Week of February 14)

See also
2010–11 Hockey East women's ice hockey season

References

Maine Black Bears women's ice hockey seasons
M
M
Black
Black